WHUT-TV, virtual channel 32 (UHF digital channel 33), is the secondary Public Broadcasting Service (PBS) member television station licensed to the American capital city of Washington, D.C. The station is owned by Howard University, a historically black college, and is sister to commercial urban contemporary radio station WHUR-FM (96.3). WHUT-TV's studios are located on the Howard University campus, and its transmitter is located in the Tenleytown neighborhood in the northwest quadrant of Washington.

WHUT airs a variety of standard PBS programming, as well as programs produced by Howard University, and international programs focusing on regions such as the Caribbean and Africa.

History

On June 25, 1974, Howard University was granted a construction permit to build a new television station on channel 32 in Washington, D.C. It was more than six years before the station signed on November 17, 1980. WHMM-TV (whose call letters stood for Howard University Mass Media) turned Howard, owner of the only radio station owned by an HBCU at the time, into the owner of the first Black-owned public television station. At the outset, the station suffered from some problems with its antenna and the need to train staff on the job. It also faced issues carving out an identity for itself and its mission, with standard PBS fare airing during much of the day; in 1983, its budget was one-third that of WETA-TV. However, within its first decade, it produced 1,000 Howard graduates trained in television production. The long-running Evening Exchange public affairs program, which debuted with the station, became a station staple; it was hosted by Kojo Nnamdi between 1985 and 2011.

Budget cuts at Howard in the late 1980s and 1990s prompted staff cuts in operations. Even as the station tried to significantly step up fundraising, its treatment as another academic department, requiring a different style of management, often hurt WHMM-TV. Staff levels were cut from 90 in 1988 to 65 five years later, when a blue-ribbon panel was convened by PBS to discuss the station's problems; that year, it had to suspend production of Evening Exchange for four months because it had lost revenue from the rights to produce D.C. Lottery drawings. In 1996, the station stopped running pledge drives when they became too expensive for the funds they raised—and would not try again until eight years later.

The call letters were changed to the present WHUT-TV in 1998 to increase channel 32's identification with the university. At the time it had signed on, the WHUT call letters belonged to a radio station in Anderson, Indiana and were not available to Howard.

Soon after the start of preparations for the 2016-17 spectrum reallocation auction, Howard University announced that it was considering the sale of WHUT-TV's channel 33 allocation in the auction in order to alleviate longstanding financial issues at the university. The station was entered into the auction when it began in March 2016. Because of WHUT-TV's status as the only black-owned public television station in the United States, the decision attracted sustained opposition from faculty and community members who feared the loss of a rare minority voice in public media. Howard announced WHUT-TV was withdrawn from the auction on February 16, 2017; the official reason was that the station's asking price had become low enough through the reverse auction process that it was apparent selling would not produce sufficient proceeds to justify ending operations.

Technical information

Subchannels
The station's ATSC 1.0 channels are carried on the multiplexed digital signal of WJLA-TV:

WHUT began broadcasting in digital in 2007. In July 2009, Washington, D.C. TV stations became a test market for Mobile DTV, and WHUT was one of the participating stations.

Analog-to-digital conversion
WHUT-TV shut down its analog signal, over UHF channel 32, on June 12, 2009, the official date in which full-power television stations in the United States transitioned from analog to digital broadcasts under federal mandate. The station's digital signal continued to broadcasts on its pre-transition UHF channel 33. Through the use of PSIP, digital television receivers display the station's virtual channel as its former UHF analog channel 32.

WHUT-TV commenced ATSC-M/H (Mobile DTV) broadcasting on February 27, 2011. WHUT-TV was the last remaining Washington-market broadcaster to broadcast an M/H signal. The signal nominally contained a feed of its main programming in standard definition on 32.1 and an audio feed of WAMU on 32.2, although neither stream contains audio or video data.

ATSC 3.0

WHUT became the Washington market's second ATSC 3.0 lighthouse station on December 15, 2021, joining Sinclair Broadcast Group's WIAV-CD (channel 58). WHUT's ATSC 3.0 signal carries its own main programming feed as well as those of Washington's four major network affiliates. As required by FCC rules, WHUT's two subchannels relocated to the signal of Sinclair's WJLA-TV (channel 7) to continue ATSC 1.0 service to existing receivers. In advance of the conversion, a more powerful transmitter was installed. The ATSC 3.0 facility will also be used in distance learning datacasting applications involving the university's own Howard University Middle School of Math and Science.

References

External links 

Howard University
PBS member stations
Television channels and stations established in 1980
1980 establishments in Washington, D.C.
HUT-TV
African-American television
ATSC 3.0 television stations